Moon Ji-hoon (Korean: 문지훈, born October 14, 1986), better known by the stage name Swings (Korean: 스윙스), is a South Korean rapper. Formerly under the label Brand New Music, he is currently signed to P Nation.

Career 
Swings debuted in 2008 with the extended play Upgrade. He joined the hip hop group Uptown in 2009 but left by the end of the year. He released his first full-length album, Growing Pains, in 2010.

He gained popularity after competing on the second season of the TV rap competition Show Me the Money in 2013. That summer, Swings triggered a 'Control diss phenomenon' within the Korean hip hop scene with the release of his diss track "King Swings Part 2", over the instrumental of Big Sean's "Control", in which he accused rapper Simon Dominic of not protecting his Supreme Team member E-Sens from an alleged slave contract offered by label Amoeba Culture. Swings was named Artist of the Year for 2013 by Korean hip hop magazine Hiphop Playa.

The "Control Diss Phenomenon" was a career-changing move for Swings. As South Korea started to adopt hip-hop culture late, there were not any significant diss-battles that happened. As diss rapping is a big part of hip-hop culture, the "Control Diss Phenomenon" was a very impactful event that created an environment where other rappers can join battles to stimulate competition and rivalry. 

In 2014, he returned to Show Me the Money as a producer for its third season, alongside established rappers including San E and Tablo.

Swings left the label Brand New Music in August 2014 to focus his own record label, Just Music. The label currently represents the rappers Black Nut, Giriboy, Genius Nochang, C Jamm, and Vasco.

In April 2017, it established its second label, Indigo Music. It has become one of the most notable hip-hop labels, recruiting Yang Hongwon (previously known as Young B), Kid Milli, Justhis, Jvcki Wai and Noel as its artists.

Psy announced on Instagram on April 29, 2021, that Swings had signed a contract with P Nation.

Personal life 
Swings is a fluent English speaker, having lived in Atlanta, Georgia, and studied English at Sungkyunkwan University.

He enlisted in the South Korean military in November 2014, despite being exempt from mandatory military service due to psychological disorders. He was discharged from the military in September 2015 due to his mental health. Swings said that he has been receiving treatment since he was young for illnesses including obsessive compulsive disorder, post-traumatic stress disorder, major depression, and bipolar disorder.

Discography

Studio albums

Extended plays

Mixtapes

Charted singles

Filmography

Television

Variety shows

References 

1986 births
Living people
South Korean male rappers
South Korean singer-songwriters
Uptown (band) members
Brand New Music artists
Show Me the Money (South Korean TV series) contestants
Sungkyunkwan University alumni
South Korean male singer-songwriters